Salar de Chalviri, also known as Salar de Ohalviri, is a salt flat in the heart of Eduardo Avaroa Andean Fauna National Reserve, in the Sur Lípez Province, Potosí Department, in southwest Bolivia. Salvador Dalí Desert is located to the southwest of the salt flat.

References

Lakes of Potosí Department
Chalviri